Leka is the main island in Leka municipality in Trøndelag county, Norway. The  island makes up about half of the area of the municipality of Leka. The island is surrounded by dozens of smaller islands. The smaller island of Madsøya lies south of Leka, and it is connected to Leka by a short bridge. There is a ferry connection between Leka and Austra, and Austra is connected to the mainland by a bridge.

The village of Leknes is the administrative centre of Leka municipality and it is located on the northeast part of the island.  The Leka Church is located on the island as well.  The mountain Lekamøya lies on the southern part of the island.

History
The island has been inhabited for at least 10,000 years, as evidenced by cave drawings in the Solsem section of the island.  Dated to the Viking Age, the burial mound Herlaugshaugen is one of the largest (in Norway) from that era.

Name
The Old Norse form of the name was Leka. The meaning of the name is unknown, but it may come from the word lekke which can mean "gravelly ground".

See also
List of islands of Norway

References

Islands of Trøndelag
Leka, Norway